"The Hope That Kills You" is the tenth episode and first season finale of the American sports comedy-drama television series Ted Lasso, based on the character played by Jason Sudeikis in a series of promos for NBC Sports' coverage of England's Premier League. The episode was written by main cast member Brendan Hunt from a story by Joe Kelly and main cast member Jason Sudeikis, and directed by MJ Delaney. It was released on Apple TV+ on October 2, 2020.

The series follows Ted Lasso, an American college football coach, who is unexpectedly recruited to coach a fictional English Premier League soccer team, AFC Richmond, despite having no experience coaching soccer. The team's owner, Rebecca Welton, hires Lasso hoping he will fail as a means of exacting revenge on the team's previous owner, Rupert, her unfaithful ex-husband. In the episode, Richmond prepares for a decesive match against Manchester City F.C., which will determinate their relegation.

The episode received extremely positive reviews from critics, who praised the performances, writing, directing and closure. For the episode, MJ Delaney was nominated for Outstanding Directing for a Comedy Series at the 73rd Primetime Emmy Awards.

Plot
Nate (Nick Mohammed) arrives to work, only to find that a man has been hired as the new kit man. Ted (Jason Sudeikis) and Rebecca (Hannah Waddingham) reveal that he has been promoted to coach for their next game against Manchester City F.C.. To motivate them, Nate shows them a video of Jamie (Phil Dunster) trash-talking the club.

Ted has Roy (Brett Goldstein) to find his replacement for the game, to which he chooses a man named Isaac. The club cannot lose or tie the game, as it will result in their relegation. Inspired by Rebecca's advice to create chaos on the field, Ted and the club come up with strategies using codes to confuse Manchester City. Jamie decides to visit Keeley (Juno Temple) after seeing a video of Ted's opinion of him, discovering that she is now in a relationship with Roy.

On the night of the game, Richmond and Manchester City end the first half in a 0-0 tie. For the second half, Ted decides to put Roy back on the field. Manchester City manages to score a goal through a penalty kick. When Jamie tries to score, Roy prevents him from doing so, although he winds up with a knee injury. He heads back to the locker room as the crowd cheers him. As commentators wonder if this was his last game, Roy is joined by Keeley in the locker room. During this, news break that Crystal Palace F.C. won a game with a 6-0 score, meaning that Richmond only needs to tie to avoid relegation.

With 3 minutes in added time, the club is now pressured for the tie. They decide to use a tactic proposed by Ted, which includes the club taking gridiron football positions, confusing the crowd and Manchester City. With the confusion, Richmond manages to send a pass to Dani (Cristo Fernández), who scores a goal. However, at the last minute, Jamie makes an extra pass to a teammate who scores and wins the game for Manchester City, effectively relegating Richmond. Ted goes to talk to Jamie, discovering his father berating him for passing the ball and not scoring a goal.

Ted then talks with his team, attempting to cheer everyone up with some advice he offered Sam (Toheeb Jimoh) earlier in the season, and that together they will get through it. Beard (Brendan Hunt) delivers a note on Ted's behalf to Jamie just as he is about to leave on a bus, where Ted congratulates him for the extra pass and gives him a toy soldier to look after him. Ted visits Rebecca to resign, but she declines the permission. They both intend to work hard for the next season to win the promotion, and then win the Premier League.

Development

Production
The character of Ted Lasso first appeared in 2013 as part of NBC Sports promoting their coverage of the Premier League, portrayed by Jason Sudeikis. In October 2019, Apple TV+ gave a series order to a series focused on the character, with Sudeikis reprising his role and co-writing the episode with executive producer Bill Lawrence. Sudeikis and collaborators Brendan Hunt and Joe Kelly started working on a project around 2015, which evolved further when Lawrence joined the series. The episode was directed by MJ Delaney and written by main cast member Brendan Hunt from a story by Joe Kelly and main cast member Jason Sudeikis. This was Delaney's second directing credit, Hunt's fourth writing credit, Kelly's fourth writing credit, and Sudeikis' fourth writing credit for the show.

Casting
The series announcement confirmed that Jason Sudeikis would reprise his role as the main character. Other actors who are credited as series regulars include Hannah Waddingham, Jeremy Swift, Phil Dunster, Brett Goldstein, Brendan Hunt, Nick Mohammed, and Juno Temple.

Critical reviews
"The Hope That Kills You" received extremely positive reviews from critics. Gissane Sophia of Marvelous Geeks Media wrote, "'The Hope That Kills You' is one of the most hopeful episodes of television I've watched in years, and yet so few things about it are actually happy. It's an episode full of some deeply sad moments, but the community established within this show is the very reason why the aftermath is somehow still so joyous." 

Mads Lennon of FanSided wrote, "Episode 10 begins with a promotion: Nate is the newest assistant coach! His days of cleaning cleats are over. Other changes in the team’s power dynamics include Roy trying to hand in his Captain's band. Ted doesn't want to accept it, but if Roy is deadset on letting go, he'll have to at least choose his successor." Daniel Hart of Ready Steady Cut gave the episode a 3.5 star rating out of 5 wrote, "No-one will grumble at a second season; the finale of Ted Lasso season 1 signs off the series in style and emotion as the football club learns their fate."

Awards and accolades
MJ Delaney was nominated for Outstanding Directing for a Comedy Series at the 73rd Primetime Emmy Awards, losing to Hacks for the episode "There Is No Line". She was also nominated for Directorial Achievement in a Comedy Series at the 73rd Directors Guild of America Awards, losing to The Flight Attendant for the episode "In Case of Emergency".

References

External links
 

Ted Lasso episodes
2020 American television episodes
Television episodes written by Jason Sudeikis